Vidrik "Frits" Rootare (born in Tallinn, Estonia August 20, 1906 – March 5, 1981) was an Estonian chess player. His wife, Salme Rootare, was also an Estonian chess player, 15-time Estonian Champion and a Women's International Master (WIM).

In 1942, in one of his best showings, he came in third in an Estonian Chess Championship behind Johannes Türn, in second place, and Paul Keres, in first. In the 1930s, he played in the Estonian Club championships. In 1930 his team won the silver medal, with Leho Laurine, Nedsvedski, and Karring. Frits, as Vidrik was known—short for Friedrich, the German spelling of his name that he used prior to Estonian independence after World War I, was a contemporary and friend of Estonia's greatest—and one of the world's greatest-ever chess players, Paul Keres, and several of their games against each other in tournament play are anthologised in chess history books and on the World Wide Web. He was also a contemporary of such Estonian players as Paul Felix Schmidt, Gunnar Friedemann, Ilmar Raud, and Tallinn-born Lithuanian international master and honorary grandmaster Vladas Mikėnas, who won the Estonian championship in 1930. Frits and his brother, Karl Johannes Rootare, also a chess player of international renown, although not twins, were often mistaken for such with the same physical stature, blond hair and blue eyes, and their shared love of chess and service in the Estonian Army. Both were Cavalry officers in the Estonian War of Independence following World War I. Karl and his wife, Karin (Kangas), left Estonia in 1944, while Frits and Salme stayed in Tallinn. Although the two near-twins and their families corresponded over the years, they were never to see each other again. Frits and Salme had a daughter, Reet Rootare, who gained some notoriety as an actress.

Notable chess games
 Keres v. Rootare, Tallinn, Est ch 1942 
 Rootare v. Keres, Tallinn, Est ch 1943 
 Keres v. Rootare, Tallinn, Est ch 1945 

1906 births
1981 deaths
Sportspeople from Tallinn
People from the Governorate of Estonia
Estonian chess players
20th-century chess players